Anna Barańska may refer to:

 Anna Werblińska (born 1984), née Barańska, Polish volleyball player
 Anna Barańska (climber) (born 1976), Polish mountaineer